Viktor Trkal (14 August 1888, Ostřetín – 3 September 1956, Prague) was a Czech physicist and mathematician who specialized in theoretical quantum physics.

Life and work
Trkal went to the Gymnasium in Vysoké Mýto where his teacher was Adolf Pařízek (1867-1920). From 1906 to 1910 he studied mathematics and physics in Prague. His mathematics professors were Karel Petr (1868–1950), Jan Sobotka (1862–1931) and then beginning Bohumil Bydžovský (1880–1969). He attended physics lectures by Čeněk Strouhal (1850–1922), Bohumil Kučera (1874–1921), František Koláček (1851–1913) and František Záviška (1879–1945). He obtained his doctorate in 1911 with a thesis on the Problem of Dirichlet and Neumann with integral equations. Then he did his one-year military service and afterwards taught at a business school in Prague in 1912-1914. During World War I Trkal was twice wounded and in March 1915 he was made prisoner of war by the Russians, after he first was considered dead but shouted "Don't shoot!" to a Russian soldier. He then stayed in several prison camps where he also contracted malaria. He wrote to Professor Orest Khvolson of St. Petersburg. Thanks to his advocacy, Trkal was assigned to the new University of Perm in the Urals, where he obtained his habilitation qualification and became associate professor of mechanics and physics in 1918. After the war he returned to Czechoslovakia where he taught in high school and became a physics assistant to Professor Záviška. In the academic year October 1919 - June 1920 Trkal studied with Hendrik Antoon Lorentz and Paul Ehrenfest in Leiden, where he was Ehrenfest's assistant and met Albert Einstein. In 1921 he graduated from the University of Prague in theoretical physics. In 1922 he was appointed extraordinary and in 1929 a full professor of theoretical physics.

Trkalian flow
Trkalian flow is named after him. In 1919, Trkal published an article in Czech on the hydromechanics of viscous fluids where he addressed the simplification of the Navier-Stokes equations used in hydromechanics. The article reached scientists abroad, mainly in France, Norway and the USA. Norwegian physicist Oddvar Bjørgum introduced the term "Trkalian field". This term (or "Trkalian flow") is now commonly used in professional international literature.

Tomb
Professor Viktor Trkal's tomb can be found in the Olšany V Cemetery, in Section 19 under the number 72. The urn with Trkal's ashes was placed in the tomb of the Baštecký family, from which his wife Marie, a high school professor (1896–1965), came. On the monument we read that her parents František and Barbora Baštecká and siblings are resting here.

Further reading
Czechoslovak Journal of Physics Viktor Trkal, Beltrami fields, and Trkalian flows
Czechoslovak Journal of Physics 70th Birthday of Professor Trkal

References

External link
  Physics.mff.cuni.cz Život a díloProfesora Viktora Trkalav obrazech

1888 births
1956 deaths
People from Pardubice District
Czech physicists
Fluid dynamicists